Azhagi is a 2002 Indian Tamil-language romantic drama film written and directed by Thangar Bachan, based on his short story "Kalvettugal". The film stars Parthiban, Nandita Das and Devayani. It was released on 14 January 2002 and won the Filmfare Award for Best Film – Tamil. The film was remade in Telugu as Letha Manasulu in 2004.

Plot 
Shanmugam, a veterinary doctor, lives in the city with his wife Valarmati and their two children. In school, Shanmugam was in love with his classmate Dhanalakshmi, but fate had forced them to go their separate ways, with Dhanam being forced to wed her brother-in-law (Sayaji Shinde). One day, Shanmugam spots Dhanam, who, having lost her husband, now lives a life of poverty on the platforms with her son Balu. After an unsuccessful attempt to find her a job in a friend's house, he hires her as their servant-maid. However, memories of the past start to create a tension between Shanmugam and Dhanam, despite their attempts to maintain a distance.

One day, Valarmati finds out from Shanmugam's old classmates how they both were in love when they were young, and she starts fearing that Shanmugam will leave her and her children for Dhanam. Valarmati becomes so distraught that she even humiliates Dhanam at a party organised by one of their friends. When they return home, Valarmati confronts Shanmugam, and an argument ensues. Dhanam overhears their argument and silently goes to bed. The next morning, Dhanam and Balu are nowhere to be found. When Shanmugam searches the house, he finds a letter written by Dhanam saying that she wants Valarmati and Shanmugam to be happy and that she doesn't want to come between them. Soon, Valarmati realises the truth and wants to bring Dhanam back home and ask her for her forgiveness.

Shanmugam searches high and low for them and at last finds Balu in an orphanage. The matron informs them that his mother had left instructions that her son should remain at the orphanage till her return. However, when the matron questions Balu, he replies that he wants to go with Shanmugam and stay in their house and to tell his mother that he is there when she returns. The matron agrees and lets him go. At the beginning of the movie, it is mentioned that Balu has been adopted by Shanmugam but still continues to call him "Sir" and never "Father or "Dad". As Shanmugam leaves for home from the orphanage, he mentions that he is still searching for Dhanam's whereabouts to that day.

Cast 

 Parthiban as Shanmugam (Veterinary Doctor)
Sathish as young Shanmugam
 Nandita Das as Dhanalakshmi aka Dhanam
 Monica as Young Dhanalakshmi aka Dhanam
 Devayani as Valarmati
 Vivek as Veterinary Doctor Desigan
 Sayaji Shinde as Dhanalakshmi's husband
 Pandu as Shanmugam's assistant, Minister
 Loose Mohan as Pandu's father-in-law
 Pyramid Natarajan
 Periyar Dasan
 Elango Kumaravel as Kaakaiyan
 George Maryan as Teacher
 Vennira Aadai Moorthy as Teacher
 Pandu

Soundtrack 
The music was composed by Ilaiyaraaja, with lyrics by himself, Palani Bharathi and Karunanithi.

Release and reception 
Azhagi was released on 14 January 2002, Pongal day. Sify wrote "Azhagi is a much talked about film, as it promises to usher in good cinema. The debutant director of the film is Thankar Bachchan,who has made a name for himself as one of the best cinematographers in Tamil. Visual Dasan of Kalki appreciated the film's plot and direction for realism while also praising the music, cinematography and performances of lead artistes. Malathi Rangarajan of The Hindu wrote "The sensitivity with which emotions have been portrayed, speaks volumes of the capabilities of director Thankar Bachchan who has already made a mark as a meritorious camera person".

Accolades 
The film won the Filmfare Award for Best Film – Tamil. At the 49th National Film Awards, Sadhana Sargam won the award for Best Female Playback Singer for the song "Pattu Solli".

Legacy 
G. Dhananjayan in his book Pride of Tamil Cinema says, " A trendsetting film shows how childhood love remains in the hearts of people even after they have grown up and settled in their adult lives. It made a deep impact among the audience and aspiring film makers.

References

Bibliography

External links 
 

2000s Tamil-language films
2002 directorial debut films
2002 films
2002 romantic drama films
Films based on short fiction
Films directed by Thangar Bachan
Films scored by Ilaiyaraaja
Indian romantic drama films
Tamil films remade in other languages